The Anglican church in the British Armed Forces falls under the jurisdiction of the Archbishop of Canterbury; however, for all practical purposes the function is performed by the Bishop to the Forces. His full title is "The Archbishop of Canterbury's Episcopal Representative to the Armed Forces". The Bishop to the Forces is not a military chaplain. The Bishop always sits in the Church's House of Bishops and (therefore) General Synod; from 2014 to 2021, this fact was utilised to give the Bishop at Lambeth (the Archbishop of Canterbury's episcopal chief of staff) a seat on both.

There is sometimes confusion between the (Anglican) "Bishop to the Forces" and the (Roman Catholic) "Bishop of the Forces": for this reason the latter is normally given his title in full, i.e. "The Roman Catholic Bishop of the Forces".

List of bishops

See also

Military archdeacon
 Royal Air Force Chaplains Branch
Royal Army Chaplains' Department
Royal Navy Chaplaincy Service

References

British military appointments
Military of the United Kingdom
 
Religion in the military